"Catch My Fall" is a song by Billy Idol from his 1983 studio album Rebel Yell. It became the album's fourth and final single (released in 1984).  It was written by Idol and produced by Keith Forsey.

Critical reception
Billboard said that "Sharp dance tracks provide the pulse" and that Idol uses a "low-key melodic vocal" comparable to his vocal performance in "Eyes Without a Face."

In a review of the 1988 UK single re-release, Kevin Rowland of Record Mirror described "Catch My Fall" as a "tough song with a good build" and also praised the "good production and playing".

Charts

References

External links 
 "Catch My Fall" at Discogs

1983 songs
1984 singles
Songs written by Billy Idol
Billy Idol songs
Song recordings produced by Keith Forsey
Chrysalis Records singles